Frank Stout (February 17, 1926 – April 13, 2012) was an American figurative artist associated with post-abstract expressionist realism. He is best known for his psychologically penetrating, witty and deeply compassionate portraits of individuals and large groups, and soulful landscapes executed with a painterly technique.
He is also known for flowing figure sculpture in a variety of media, and his pastel drawings.

He lived in Vermont and Tuscany.

Life
Frank Stout was born in Lynn, Massachusetts in 1926. After a stint in navy training, he won a place at the School of the Museum of Fine Arts, Boston, on the G.I. Bill (1949–1950).

He married Constance Lyle in 1951, and moved to New York. As well as full-time painting, he did drafting work for architects I.M. Pei & Associates, a skill later enabling him to design his own modernist home in Vermont. He travelled to Peru in 1954, invited to exhibit at the Society of Architects, and was awarded a commission from the American Embassy in Lima. On returning to Manhattan, Constance died. Stout married Chaewoon Koh, in 1960, and an only child was born, (Mira Stout: a writer [1]); both of whom appear as portrait subjects throughout his career.

Stout's first US solo show came in 1960 at the Tanager Gallery in New York, showcasing many of the avant garde then gathered around the 10th Street galleries and the Cedar Tavern. Friends and neighbours included Robert Rauschenberg, Alex Katz, Wolf Kahn, Emily Mason, Marisol, Lois Dodd, and Willem de Kooning. His career developed on through a series of solo exhibits at the Dorsky Gallery on Madison Avenue, continuing until dealer Sam Dorsky's death in 1966, when Stout accepted an appointment as Artist-in-Residence at Marlboro College in Vermont [2].After a hiatus from showing in New York, he returned to one-man exhibitions with the Landmark Gallery in Soho in the late '70's-early '80's, with shows of flowing figure sculpture, mainly in terracotta, wire, and poured plaster. He then showed both sculpture and painting at a number of East Coast museums and galleries, including the Queens Museum, Fleming Museum, Museum of Fine Arts, Springfield (MA), MIT (Massachusetts Institute of Technology) and Princeton galleries, University of Maine, and the Kornbluth Gallery.

A fire in the late '70s destroyed much of Stout's work. He went on to produce a prodigious body of new paintings and sculpture; including his seminal 'Convention Pictures'; Americana landscapes; supermarket still-lives; and a wide variety of sculpture [3]. He combined this intense productivity with his appointment to Chair of the Art Department at Marlboro.
In 1981-82 Stout spent a year in Tuscany teaching art; a lasting influence on his life and work. He and his wife Chaewoon purchased a property in the hills outside Siena, where they mostly lived until her death in 1987; Stout remained there, working intensively until 2006. He focussed mainly on Italianate subjects, and completed his 'Artists & Models Series', a cycle of artist-portraits from Canova to Freud [4]. While abroad, out of the mainstream art scene, he continued to receive honors and public commissions, including a controversial plaza sculpture installation at the Vermont State House [5]--initially bronze nudes, revised to wildlife after an indecency outcry—plus commissioned state portraits, appointments to the Vermont Council on the Arts, The VT Studio School and The New England Foundation for the Arts.

Stout continued to paint, sculpt and exhibit. He had retrospectives (2000, 2001 & 2008) in Vermont and New York City, with shows at the Painting Center and Lohin-Geduld Gallery in New York City, The Drury Gallery, Marlboro, and the Brattleboro Museum (BMAC). His work is featured in several permanent public collections across the US and abroad. Reviews and essays on Stout have appeared in 'The New York Times', 'The New York Observer', 'Brattleboro Reformer', 'American Artist' and 'Harpers' magazine, among other publications. Famously private and reclusive, Stout has granted few interviews.[6]

Frank Stout received awards from the National Academy (HF Ranger Award) and American Academy of Arts and Letters.

Early work
Frank Stout's painting of the 1950s moved from total abstraction to gnomic semi-abstraction, influenced by Peruvian ceramics and folkloric imagery. In the 1960s, Stout's work become representational, painting bold portraits, everyday objects, interiors & planar landscapes using heavy impasto and drippy abstract expressionist brushstrokes. Stout's budding realism was chiefly influenced then by expressionist Oskar Kokoschka (6).

Sculpture

From the early '70's Stout applied himself to sculpture in tandem with painting, initially large abstract wood and marble pieces, showing unusual versatility across the two practices [12: ref :Rohn]. He soon abandoned pure abstraction for figurative work with ceramic pieces bearing a Picassoid influence. [13: ref: Rohn/Kahn p. 4] Stout's terracotta works include a series of jazz artists & small-scale nude figures, sometimes in bathing suits and street clothes, executed with loose, gestural lines and sensuous contours.

He created a cycle of original wall-friezes and 3-D plaque portraits in fired clay and plaster in the '80's and '90s, employing minimal but exacting detail; painted glaze accents and carved linear marks. He also worked in alabaster, and produced medium-sized nude figures in poured plaster over wire mesh, later paring this down to the armature screen itself, achieving a luminous effect. Additionally, he uses unconventional found materials; notably foam plumbing insulation, Styrofoam, sheet metal, plastic bottles, wooden ice-cream sticks and steel wool. His style closely echoes that of his painting: playful and assured, with an economy of line and wry humor described as "throwaway virtuosity". [ref: Wolf Kahn to David Rohn, 1999. ibid p. 6]:

Mature work
From the late 70s onward, Stout's painting style became more polished and ambitious in subject matter, with a satirical edge and cruelty sometimes compared with Jack Levine [7] and Francis Bacon [8]. His subdued palette, Old Master scumbling and complex compositions pay homage to Titian, Rembrandt, Frans Hals, and Velasquez, but his painterly method is harnessed to contemporary subjects also via expressionism [9] and his own bold improvisational technique, with tone-shifts from high art intention to exuberant caricature.

The primacy of figure painting in his work is manifest in his "Artists & Models Series" (late 1990s-2008); portraits of iconic artists and their subjects. Single and group portraits of both the famous and the obscure populate his oeuvre, from Pope John Paul II to anonymous nursing graduates, family snaps, a Native American tribe, and his noted 'Convention Pictures'; monumental group portraits of corporate and civic gatherings captured on a cinematic scale. Stout's work ruminates on themes of the Individual and Society [10], and the passing of time.
His images of intimacy and of anonymity in 20th-21st century culture are rendered with a sensitive, but dispassionate eye, covering a spectrum of moods from the melancholic to the ridiculous. Portraits of Doris Day and D.W. Griffiths' golden age of Hollywood are juxtaposed with winos, and landscapes of decaying New England cinemas, Masonic lodges, abandoned farms, factories, trailers, and fast food outlets.
Where Photo Realists and Pop Realists assert a coolly ironic stance towards similar imagery [11], Stout expresses an interest in the psychological and emotional character of his subjects as well as their graphic/optical attributes. Where the former use flatness and color to achieve a sense of distance, Stout uses light and pigment to create illusionistic depth and engagement.
A sense of restlessness and transience haunt Stout's depopulated landscapes, while the faces in his portraits convey a complicity and bafflement about their roles in the occasions captured. Stout's wide-ranging subject matter forms an additive portrait of contemporary society in transition; moments frozen within a broader, uncertain human narrative. [14].

In a sense, Stout was an American Rembrandt, concerned to portray his human subjects as being tethered to their means of livelihood, whether it was butchers at a butchers' convention, or a waiter at a table, but he also had an extraordinarily loving way with such humble objects as trailer-homes, which are not ordinarily thought of as being beautiful but which can take on a profoundly spiritual cast in his unique and transformative vision.

Public Collections
 American Embassy, Brazil (São Paulo)
 American Embassy, Peru (Lima)

 National Academy, New York, NY
 Wichita Art Museum, Wichita, KS
 Museum of Fine Arts, Springfield, MA
 Vermont State House, Montpelier, VT
 City Hall Fountain, Burlington, VT
 Vermont Arts Council, Montpelier. VT
 The University of Vermont, Burlington, VT
 Brattleboro Memorial Hospital, Brattleboro, VT
 Sheldon Swope Art Gallery, Terre Haute, IN
 The US Information Agency Federal Building, Washington, DC

References

 1. ^ Rohn, David & Kahn, Wolf, The Art of Frank Stout, 2000;
 2. ^ Rohn, David & Kahn, Wolf, The Art of Frank Stout, 2000;
 3. ^ Rohn, David & Kahn, Wolf, The Art of Frank Stout, 2000;
 4. ^ Rohn, David & Kahn, Wolf, The Art of Frank Stout, 2000;
 5. ^ Vermont State House Plaza, Burlington, VT. 
 6. ^ Mara Williams curator essay; 'About Frank Stout'; website
 7. ^ Rohn, David & Kahn,Wolf, The Art of Frank Stout, 2000;
 8. ^ Rohn, David & Kahn, Wolf, The Art of Frank Stout, 2000; 
 9. Johnson, Ken, Frank Stout, The New York Times, February 2001;
 10. ^ Naves, Mario, Currently Hanging: Stout's Conventioneers, Nixon and Clinton", The New York Observer, February 2001;
 11. ^ Bui, Phong,Frank Stout, The Brooklyn Rail, May–June 2001. see here;
 12. ^ Naves, Mario, Currently Hanging: Stout's Conventioneers, Nixon and Clinton, The New York Observer, February 2001;
 13. ^ Kahn, Wolf, The Subject Matter in New Realism'', American Artist, November 1979, pp 53–54.
 14. ^ Williams, Mara, ibid.

External links
 Official website
 Brattleboro Museum & Art Center (BMAC) (see also Stout interviewed by Wolf Kahn at BMAC (2000), in the museum's video archive)
 City Hall Plaza, Burlington
 https://web.archive.org/web/20110703155705/http://www.marlboro.edu/news/publications/potash_hill/Winter09
 https://web.archive.org/web/20110201233240/http://mirastout.com/
 An image
 The Painting Center

1926 births
2012 deaths
20th-century American painters
American male painters
21st-century American painters
21st-century American male artists
Artists from Massachusetts
Artists from New York (state)
Artists from Vermont
20th-century American male artists